Croatia competed at the 2002 Winter Olympics in Salt Lake City, United States.  Janica Kostelić won four medals (three gold), a record for the most medals ever won by a woman skier at a single Olympics.  Croatia had never won any Winter Olympic medals previously.

Medalists

Alpine Skiing 

Men

Women

Biathlon 

Men

Bobsleigh

Cross-country skiing 

 Maja Kezele
 women's 15 km freestyle: 55th place
 women's 10 km classical: 57th place
 women's 10 km (5 km + 5 km) pursuit: 66th place
 Damir Jurčević
 men's  30 km freestyle: 63rd place
 men's 15 km classical: 61st place
 men's 20 km (10 km + 10 km) pursuit: 72nd place
 sprint 1,5 km freestyle: 48th place
 men's 50 km classical: 53rd place
 Denis Klobučar
 men's  30 km freestyle: 66th place
 men's 15 km classical: 58th place
 men's 20 km (10 km + 10 km) pursuit: 67th place
 men's 50 km classical: 54th place

Figure skating 

 Idora Hegel women's individual
 19th place

References

Official Olympic Reports
International Olympic Committee results database

Nations at the 2002 Winter Olympics
2002
2002 in Croatian sport